Bibloporus is a genus of beetle belonging to the family Staphylinidae.

The genus was first described by Thomson in 1859.

The species of this genus are found in Europe.

Species:
 Bibloporus bicolor (Denny, 1825)

References

Pselaphinae
Staphylinidae genera